Robert Garry Hart (born 2 December 1974) is a New Zealand cricketer. He was the first-choice Test wicket-keeper for the New Zealand national cricket team following the retirement of Adam Parore.

Hart played 11 Tests for his country and took 29 catches and one stumping before retiring in August 2004. He did not feature much at international level with the bat but scored a solitary fifty against the West Indies.

His brother, Matthew, also played cricket for Northern Districts Knights and New Zealand.

Hart is a member of the Sports Tribunal of New Zealand.

References

1974 births
Living people
New Zealand One Day International cricketers
New Zealand Test cricketers
New Zealand cricketers
Northern Districts cricketers
Cricketers from Hamilton, New Zealand
Wicket-keepers